Devetaci may refer to:

 Devetaci (Novi Grad), a village in Bosnia and Herzegovina
 Devetaci (Kiseljak), a village in Bosnia and Herzegovina